The 1979 San Diego Padres season was the 11th season in franchise history.

Offseason 
 October 25, 1978: Oscar Gamble, Dave Roberts and $300,000 were traded by the Padres to the Texas Rangers for Mike Hargrove, Kurt Bevacqua, and Bill Fahey.
 March 1, 1979: Fred Kuhaulua was signed as a free agent by the Padres.

Regular season

Season standings

Record vs. opponents

Opening Day lineup

Notable transactions 
 June 5, 1979: Bob Geren was drafted by the Padres in the 1st round (24th pick) of the 1979 Major League Baseball Draft.
 June 15, 1979: Dave Wehrmeister was traded by the Padres to the Yankees for Jay Johnstone.

Roster

Player stats

Batting

Starters by position 
Note: Pos = Position; G = Games played; AB = At bats; H = Hits; Avg. = Batting average; HR = Home runs; RBI = Runs batted in

Other batters 
Note: G = Games played; AB = At bats; H = Hits; Avg. = Batting average; HR = Home runs; RBI = Runs batted in

Pitching

Starting pitchers 
Note: G = Games pitched; IP = Innings pitched; W = Wins; L = Losses; ERA = Earned run average; SO = Strikeouts

Other pitchers 
Note: G = Games pitched; IP = Innings pitched; W = Wins; L = Losses; ERA = Earned run average; SO = Strikeouts

Relief pitchers 
Note: G = Games pitched; W = Wins; L = Losses; SV = Saves; ERA = Earned run average; SO = Strikeouts

Awards and honors 
1979 Major League Baseball All-Star Game

Farm system

References

External links
 1979 San Diego Padres team page at Baseball Reference
 1979 San Diego Padres team page at Baseball Almanac

San Diego Padres seasons
San Diego Padres season
San Diego Padres